
Gmina Popów is a rural gmina (administrative district) in Kłobuck County, Silesian Voivodeship, in southern Poland.

Villages
Gmina Popów contains the villages and settlements of Annolesie, Antonie, Brzózki, Dąbrowa, Dąbrówka, Dębie, Florianów, Kamieńszczyzna, Kule, Lelity, Marianów, Nowa Wieś, Płaczki, Popów, Popów-Parcela, Rębielice Królewskie, Smolarze, Wąsosz Dolny, Wąsosz Górny, Więcki, Wrzosy, Zawady and Zbory.

Neighbouring gminas
Gmina Popów is bordered by the gminas of Działoszyn, Lipie, Miedźno, Nowa Brzeźnica, Opatów and Pajęczno.

References

Popow
Kłobuck County